R. Chinnasamy is an Indian politician and former Member of the Legislative Assembly of Tamil Nadu. He was elected to the Tamil Nadu legislative assembly from Dharmapuri constituency as a Dravida Munnetra Kazhagam candidate in 1971, 1984 and 1989 elections.

He was a district secretary in DMK nearly 15 years

References 

Dravida Munnetra Kazhagam politicians
Living people
Year of birth missing (living people)
Tamil Nadu MLAs 1985–1989